George Allen Mebane (born July 4, 1850) was a state legislator in North Carolina. He lived in Windsor. He was African American. He served in the North Carolina Senate during the 1876-1877 session representing Bertie County and Northampton County.

He served along with four other African Americans in the North Carolina Senate in the 1876-1877 session, William H. Moore , Hanson T. Hughes, John R. Bryant, and William P. Mabson.

See also
African-American officeholders during and following the Reconstruction era

References

1850 births
North Carolina politicians

Living people